Victoria Movsessian (born November 6, 1972) is an American ice hockey player. She won a gold medal at the 1998 Winter Olympics. She was the founder of the Massachusetts Spitfires and Rhode Island Sting girls hockey clubs. Movsessian was born in Concord, Massachusetts, but grew up in Lexington, Massachusetts.

Playing career
Movsessian played for the Providence Friars women's ice hockey program and was twice an All-ECAC selection.

Personal
After graduating magna cum laude from Providence (her degree was in marketing and business administration), she worked for Prudential.

She is married to Chris Lamoriello, the son of New York Islanders president of hockey operations and general manager Lou Lamoriello.

Awards and honors
All-ECAC in 1991-92
All-ECAC in 1992-93

References

External links
Bio

1972 births
American people of Armenian descent
American women's ice hockey defensemen
Ice hockey players from Massachusetts
Ice hockey players at the 1998 Winter Olympics
Living people
Medalists at the 1998 Winter Olympics
Olympic gold medalists for the United States in ice hockey
People from Concord, Massachusetts
People from Lexington, Massachusetts
Providence Friars women's ice hockey players
Sportspeople from Middlesex County, Massachusetts